The Sanctuary of Our Lady of Dorleta is in the village of Leintz Gatzaga in the Gipuzkoa province of the Basque Country in Spain, near the Arlaban pass. The sanctuary has been documented since the Middle Ages, but most of the current structure is Baroque. Our Lady of Dorleta is considered the patron saint of cyclists in Spain.

References

See also
Madonna del Ghisallo, in Lombardy, Italy, is the Italian equivalent of the Nuestra Señora de Dorleta, being the patroness for all Italian cyclists.
Notre Dame des Cyclistes, in Aquitaine, France, is the French equivalent as well, being the patron for all French cyclists, and a major stop in the Tour de France.

External links
 

Churches in the Basque Country (autonomous community)
Roman Catholic shrines in Spain
Shrines to the Virgin Mary
Cycling in Spain
Buildings and structures in Gipuzkoa